This was the second of four editions of the tournament in the 2021 ATP Challenger Tour calendar.

Zdeněk Kolář was the defending champion but chose not to defend his title.

Pedro Cachín won the title after defeating Nuno Borges 7–6(7–4), 7–6(7–3) in the final.

Seeds

Draw

Finals

Top half

Bottom half

References

External links
Main draw
Qualifying draw

Open de Oeiras II - 1